Alpha Motor Corporation (commonly known as Alpha) is an American electric vehicle company based in Irvine, California.

History
Alpha Motor Corporation was founded in 2020 by Edward Lee. Prior to founding Alpha, Lee has worked at several automotive companies, including Toyota—where he designed the 2012 Lexus LF-LC concept, Audi, and the short-lived EV startup company Neuron Corporation—where he was signed as an executive at.

Alpha teased its first vehicle, the Icon electric commercial vehicle, on December 2, 2020. The Icon was never officially unveiled, however. Later that month on December 23, Alpha revealed its first passenger car, the Ace coupe notably featuring retro styling, as a 3D model. Alpha Motor Company stated that it would unveil more vehicles in the coming months.

In February 2021, Alpha revealed the Ace-based Jax, a crossover quad coupe, as a 3D model. With "Jax" being an acronym of "Junior All-terrain Crossover", it is essentially an Ace with two extra half-doors in the rear for easier rear access, a higher suspension, and off-roading accessories. Alongside the Jax, Alpha also revealed the Ace Performance, a sport variant of the standard Ace model.

In March 2021, Alpha revealed its third car, the Wolf 2-door pickup truck, based on the company's previously-revealed cars. The company later revealed two variants of the Wolf; the Wolf+, an extended cab version, in April, and the SuperWolf, a double cab version, in July. The Alpha Wolf pickups and the company's other vehicles only existed as 3D models, until Alpha Motor Corporation presented its first physical example of a car, the Wolf pickup, at the Petersen Automotive Museum, Los Angeles in August.

In November 2021, Alpha Motor Corporation introduced the Adventure Series, a special edition package for the Ace and Jax, in partnership with KC HiLiTES and KMC Wheels. The Adventure Series package adds new off-road lights, tires, and wheels to the cars.

On October 31, 2021, Los Angeles Auto Show, announced the Alpha Ace Coupe and Jax as finalists for its inaugural zero-emission vehicle awards program - THE ZEVAS 

On November 18, 2021, Los Angeles Auto Show, announced the Alpha Ace Coupe as "Top Coupe" and the winner in the electric coupe category for its inaugural zero-emission vehicle awards program - THE ZEVAS 

On November 19, 2021, at the Los Angeles Auto Show, Alpha revealed its second physical vehicle example, the Saga, which is a sedan based on the Ace.

On March 22, 2022, the parent company of Rolling Stone Korea, e.L.e Media, and South Korean carmaker CNP Motors announced that they had signed a pact with American vehicle company Alpha Motor Corporation on March 12, 2022.

On April 12, 2022, Alpha Motor Corporation and Hinduja Tech announced a partnership for the development and production of electric vehicles, post production support, joint research, and development of other mobility projects.

On May 22, 2022, Alpha Motor Corporation and Ultimate Hydroforming, Inc (UHI) entered a Memorandum of Understanding (MoU) as UHI will manufacture and validate Alpha Motor Corporation's production-ready electric vehicles.

Vehicles
Alpha Motor Corporation plans to launch to following cars by the end of 2023:

 Ace, an electric subcompact coupe
 Jax, an electric subcompact quad coupe crossover
 Saga, an electric compact sedan
 Wolf, an electric 2-door compact pickup truck
 Wolf+, an extended cab variant of the Wolf
 SuperWolf, a double cab variant of the Wolf

References

American companies established in 2020
Car manufacturers of the United States
Companies based in Irvine, California